Pero may refer to:

 Pero (mythology), several personages in Greek mythology
 Pero (princess), daughter of Neleus
 Pero (name), a list of people with either the given name or surname Pero
 Pero language, a language of Nigeria
 Pero, Lombardy, an Italian commune
 Pero (Milan Metro), an Italian train station in Pero, Lombardy
 Pero (beverage), a hot grain beverage
 Pero (moth), a moth genus
 Pero (Roman Charity), a character in Roman mythology
 Pero (The Wonderful World of Puss 'n Boots), the protagonist character of the 1969 Japanese animated musical

See also
 Paro (disambiguation)
 Pera (disambiguation)
 Pere (disambiguation)
 Peri (disambiguation)
 Perro (disambiguation)
 Piro (disambiguation)
 Puro (disambiguation)